US Post Office-Monroe is a historic post office building located at Monroe, Union County, North Carolina.  It was designed by the Office of the Supervising Architect under the direction of Oscar Wenderoth and built in 1913.  It is a two-story, seven bay by four bay, brick building in the Classical Revival style.  The front facade features a five bay portico supported by Corinthian order columns.  Two additions were made to the building in 1966.

It was listed on the National Register of Historic Places in 1985.

References

Monroe
Neoclassical architecture in North Carolina
Government buildings completed in 1913
Buildings and structures in Union County, North Carolina
National Register of Historic Places in Union County, North Carolina
1913 establishments in North Carolina